Hagan Park is the home of IFA Championship team Coagh United. It is situated in the village of Coagh in County Tyrone, Northern Ireland.

The ground was given to the club as a grant from the local Hagan family when Coagh United found themselves homeless, and much work has been carried out since.

The main stand at Hagan Park seats 131 people in two rows of plastic seating while a third row behind is padded seating similar in style to seating which would be found in a pub or restaurant. These padded seats are the most popular area of the ground with younger fans and families. Seating only populates half of the stand with the other half being a standing terrace, most popular with the club's core supporters. The stand runs for two-thirds of the playing area with the club rooms to its right and a small kiosk and burger bar to the left. There are two turnstiles.

The opposite stand runs roughly half of the playing area either side of the halfway line and can seat 48 spectators on a wooden bench at the rear of the stand. This bench is not popular and largely unused as fans who populate this stand prefer to stand along a metal crush bar at the front of the stand. This obliterates the view for any who choose to sit in this stand. It is most popular with visiting fans, though open to all. Both stands are covered.

The two ends of the ground are undeveloped and populated on match days by ball boys only. There is room for fans to stand behind either goal if they wish.

The ground accommodates around 40 cars in its own car park and has a social club in a portable cabin next to the ground, which is open on match days.

External links
Official Coagh United Website
IFCP photos from Hagan Park

Association football venues in Northern Ireland
Sports venues in County Tyrone